Keyboard tablature is a form of musical notation for keyboard instruments. Widely used in some parts of Europe from the 15th century, it co-existed with, and was eventually replaced by modern staff notation in the 18th century. The defining characteristic of the best known type, German organ tablature, is the use of letters to indicate pitch (with added stems or loops to indicate accidentals) as well as beams for rhythm. Spain and Portugal used a slightly different cipher tablature, called cifra.

Historical details
The earliest extant music manuscripts written in German tablature date from the first half of the 15th century, with the oldest example, a German manuscript dating from 1432, containing the earliest known setting of a partial organ mass as well as a piece based on a cantus firmus. These manuscripts used letters (the same as today) to identify pitch, with the upper voice typically written on a staff in mensural notation. This style was also present in other German-speaking areas, such as Austria. These manuscripts contain valuable information as to the evolution of the music from the period, with extensive evidence of the influence of vocal, and later dance music, on early instrumental music. This practice which could still be seen in collections from the 16th century eventually led to the full-fledged Baroque dance suites of later centuries. This hybrid tablature was also featured in some early printed music books, such as Arnolt Schlick’s Tabulaturen etlicher Lobgesang und Lidlein of 1512.

Later notation that included the upper voice in letters as well became prevalent in the latter part of the 16th century. Even works published in open score, such as Samuel Scheidt's Tablatura Nova (1624), may have been influenced by the strict vertical alignment of so-called "new German organ tablature". Remaining in use in Germany (and neighboring areas, such as modern-day Hungary or Poland) through the time of Bach, the music of some composers of the period remains available only in manuscript tablature format. The last use of this style of notation is in Johann Samuel Petri’s Anleitung zur praktischen Musik (1782).

In France, England and Italy, staff notation was the norm, and while there are isolated examples of tablature from England (the 14c Robertsbridge codex), there is no evidence that such use was as widespread as in Germany.

Notation

North German tablature

The use of tablature was not limited to solely keyboard music: many vocal works of the period, notably in the Düben collection, survive in this format.

Iberian cipher notation
Juan Bermudo's  Declaración de instrumentos musicales (1555) introduced two tablatures, one assigning numerals from 1 to 42 to each key of the organ, and the second counting white keys only from 1 to 23. Only a third method of cifra was widely adopted however: introduced in Venegas de Henestrosa's Libro de cifra nueva (1557), and later used in Cabezón’s Obras de música (1578), it used 1-7 with together accidentals; slashes lower the octave and superscript dots raise it.

Footnotes

Citations

Bibliography

See also
 Tablature
 Klavarskribo
 Piano roll

External links
Obras de musica para tecla, arpa y vihuela (click "View options" JPG icon) - Biblioteca Nacional de España info

Musical notation